Riung is a language of central Flores, in East Nusa Tenggara Province, Indonesia. It has sometimes been considered a dialect of Manggarai to the west, but is only marginally intelligible with it.

References

Further reading

 

Sumba languages
Languages of Indonesia